The 1999 Alamo Bowl featured the Penn State Nittany Lions and the Texas A&M Aggies.

Derek Fox started the scoring for Penn State, with a 34-yard interception return for a touchdown. In the second quarter, quarterback Rashard Casey threw a 45-yard touchdown pass to wide receiver Eddie Drummond.  After a scoreless third quarter, Rashard Casey scored on a 4-yard run, to put Penn State up 21–0.  Travis Forney then capped the game with a 39-yard field goal.

This game was a bright ending to what was an otherwise disappointing season for Penn State.  Ranked #3 in the preseason polls, the team won their first nine games, including victories at #8 Miami and when hosting #4 Arizona.  However, the Nittany Lions then lost their last three games by a combined 12 points, dropping them to fourth place in the Big Ten Conference.  This was the only shutout bowl victory during Joe Paterno's tenure as head coach of Penn State.  The only other bowl shutout for Penn State was a 7–0 defeat of Alabama in the 1959 Liberty Bowl.

The game was Penn State defensive coordinator Jerry Sandusky's last. It is also alleged that Sandusky engaged in sexual misconduct with a minor during the trip to the 1999 Alamo Bowl. This was one of the victories vacated as punishment by the NCAA on July 23, 2012 as a result of the ensuing scandal.

The 2007 Alamo Bowl was Penn State and Texas A&M's only other bowl meeting, where the Nittany Lions edged the Aggies, 24–17.  Penn State and Texas A&M have also met twice during regular season play: the Aggies won 27–14 at Penn State in 1979, and the Lions won 25–9 in College Station in 1980.

References

External links
Review of the game by USA Today

Alamo Bowl
Alamo Bowl
Penn State Nittany Lions football bowl games
Texas A&M Aggies football bowl games
December 1999 sports events in the United States
1999 in sports in Texas